Apisai Namata Naikatini (born April 4, 1985) is a Fijian rugby union footballer. He plays lock and blindside flank for Fiji and Old Glory DC of Major League Rugby (MLR) in the United States.

Early life
Naikatini attended the prestigious Marist Brothers High School and Natabua High School in Fiji, and Wanganui City College while playing in New Zealand.

Club career
In 2007, he joined NZ provincial side Wellington for the 2007 Air New Zealand Cup. He made his provincial debut on 31 August against Counties Manukau at Blindside Flank. He helped his team reach the final. The following year, he was also instrumental in taking the team to the final but losing this time to Canterbury and then again in 2009. He made his Super Rugby debut coming on the bench in 2009 against the Cheetahs. He also played for the Hurricanes Development side in the Pacific Rugby Cup in 2011. He was also part of the Ranfurly Shield winning team. He joined Japanese side Toyota Verblitz at the end of 2012.

He helped his Wellington side to the 2013 ITM Cup final but lost to Canterbury.

France
In December 2013, he signed a short-term deal with French Top 14 side, Brive for the remainder of the 2013–14 Top 14 season, filling in for lock, Olivier Caisso who is fighting Hodgkin's lymphoma.

After his short stint, he joined another top 14 team, Agen the following season. He spent the 2016–17 season with Rugby Club Aubenas Vals in Fédérale 1. After this he returned to New Zealand to play club rugby with Johnsonville RFC.

United States
On 17 January 2019, he joined recently established American Major League Rugby outfit the Seattle Seawolves. He then moved across the country to Old Glory DC for the 2020 season.

International career
Naikatini played 18 matches for Fiji between 2012 and 2014. He made his international debut for  Fiji against Japan in the 2012 IRB Pacific Nations Cup at lock. He scored his first try a year later against Japan in the 2013 IRB Pacific Nations Cup.

He was initially named in Fiji's extended squad for the 2015 World Cup but was then assigned to non-traveling reserve status.

Honours

Fiji
Pacific Nations Cup: 2013

References

External links
 ESPNScrum Profile
 ItsRugby Profile
 Yahoo Profile

1985 births
Living people
CA Brive players
Expatriate rugby union players in Japan
Expatriate rugby union players in France
Expatriate rugby union players in New Zealand
Expatriate rugby union players in the United States
Fiji international rugby union players
Fijian expatriate rugby union players
Fijian expatriate sportspeople in France
Fijian expatriate sportspeople in Japan
Fijian expatriate sportspeople in New Zealand
Fijian expatriate sportspeople in the United States
I-Taukei Fijian people
Old Glory DC players
Hurricanes (rugby union) players
Rugby union flankers
Rugby union locks
Sportspeople from Nadi
Toyota Verblitz players
Wellington rugby union players
SU Agen Lot-et-Garonne players
Seattle Seawolves players
Waikato rugby union players